Çamlı (adjective form of the Turkish word çam for "pine" and therefore literally "piny" or "piney") may refer to the following places in Turkey:

 Çamlı, Dinar
 Çamlı, Erdemli
 Çamlı, Hopa
 Çamlı, Manyas
 Çamlı, Yığılca

See also
Çamlıbel (disambiguation)
Çamlıca (disambiguation)
Çamlıdere (disambiguation)
Çamlıhemşin
Çamlıyayla